The Kurgalsky Peninsula (Russian: Кургальский полуостров) is a peninsula that divides the southern part of the Gulf of Finland into the Narva Bay (to the west) and the Luga Bay (to the east). The northernmost spot is Cape Pitkenen-Nos. The peninsula is rather swampy and contains several lakes. About 650 km² of wetland are protected as a Ramsar site. The port of Ust'-Luga is situated on the peninsula. There are many Izhorian villages in the district.

See also 
 Soikinsky Peninsula

References

External links
 

Landforms of Leningrad Oblast
Peninsulas of Russia
Ramsar sites in Russia
Kingiseppsky District